Andreas Glockner (born 25 February 1988) is a German former professional footballer who played as a left winger.

Career
Glockner was born in Titisee-Neustadt. He began his career with SpVgg Bollschweil Sölden and joined later Eintracht Freiburg. He played a few years for Eintracht Freiburg and was then scouted by SC Freiburg. Glockner played eight years for SC Freiburg's youth teams and was in July 2006 promoted to the Bundesliga team. After three and a half years for SC Freiburg as a professional he was loaned to TuS Koblenz in January 2010.

He retired as a player after the 2018–19 season.

References

External links
 
 

Living people
1988 births
Association football forwards
German footballers
SC Freiburg players
TuS Koblenz players
1. FC Heidenheim players
VfL Osnabrück players
1. FC Saarbrücken players
SC Fortuna Köln players
Wormatia Worms players
Bundesliga players
2. Bundesliga players
3. Liga players
Regionalliga players